The 155th Rifle Division was an infantry division of the Red Army of the Soviet Union. It was established in Opotschka in 1939. In December 1939, it fought in the Winter War and attacked the town of Lieksa. In October 1941, it was destroyed in Bryansk. 

On October 28, 1941 the 1st and 2nd Moscow Worker's Brigades were in Moscow formed using Destroyer Battalions' troops, similar to the earlier People's Militia formations. On November 14, 1941, they were upgraded in status to the 4th and 5th Moscow Rifle Divisions respectively. On January 20, 1942 the 4th Moscow Rifle Division was redesignated the 155th Rifle Division (Second Formation).

During the rest of the Second World War, it fought in Kalinin, Kursk, the Carpathians, and Budapest. By May 1945, it served with the 27th Army of the 3rd Ukrainian Front. In the summer of 1945, the division was disbanded and the soldiers then served with the Southern Group of Forces.

References 

Infantry divisions of the Soviet Union in World War II
Military units and formations established in 1939
Military units and formations disestablished in 1945
1939 establishments in the Soviet Union
1945 disestablishments in the Soviet Union
Winter War